Lyudmyla Kostiantynivna Poradnyk-Bobrus (née Bobrus, born January 11, 1946, in Kyiv, Ukrainian SSR) is a former Soviet/Ukrainian handball player who competed in the 1976 Summer Olympics and in the 1980 Summer Olympics.

In 1976 she won the gold medal with the Soviet team. She played all five matches and scored six goals.

Four years later she was a member of the Soviet team which won the gold medal again. She played all five matches and scored two goals.

External links
 
 
 

1946 births
Living people
Sportspeople from Kyiv
Soviet female handball players
Ukrainian female handball players
Handball players at the 1976 Summer Olympics
Handball players at the 1980 Summer Olympics
Olympic handball players of the Soviet Union
Olympic gold medalists for the Soviet Union
Olympic medalists in handball
Medalists at the 1980 Summer Olympics
Medalists at the 1976 Summer Olympics